Edward Michael Behrens (15 September 1911 - January 1989) was a British financier, banker, stockbroker, and restaurant and gallery owner, who became co-owner of the Ionian Bank. Through his ownership of the Hanover Gallery, he was an early patron of the artist Francis Bacon.

Early life
Edward Michael Behrens was born on 15 September 1911, in Kensington, London. His father was Noel Edward Behrens (1879–1967), a civil servant until his retirement in 1921 and then a banker, and his wife, Catherine Vivien Coward (1880–1961), the daughter of Sir Cecil Coward (1845–1938). His elder sister was the historian and academic Betty Behrens.

Career
In 1953, he already owned La Resèrve restaurant, when he bought the "influential" Hanover Gallery from Arthur Jeffress. Hanover Gallery represented Francis Bacon who had his first solo show there in 1949, and did so until 1958 when he left for the Marlborough Gallery. Behrens was visiting the empty gallery for the first time one evening when Erica Brausen, who ran the gallery, mentioned in passing that she would be closing up the next day. Behrens was "immediately fascinated" by Bacon's work, and offered to help. Jeffress "detested" Bacon and that was his main reason for backing out of the Hanover Gallery. Jeffress apparently thought that Behrens also "loathed" Bacon.

In 1958, Behrens and John Trusted, both stockbrokers at the time and directors of the British Bank for Foreign Trade, acquired the long-established Ionian Bank. Ionian Bank became "a leader in North Sea oil".

Personal life

In 1936, he married Helen Constance Felicity Arnold (1913-2001), and they had three sons, including the artist Timothy Behrens. Even though he had bought the "influential" Hanover Gallery from Arthur Jeffress, he was not happy with his son's wish to pursue an artistic career.

They lived at 8 Hanover Terrace, overlooking Regent's Park, and in 1949 bought Culham Court, a large house in Berkshire on the river Thames. After his death, Felicity lived there until 1996.

Behrens had an affair with the novelist Elizabeth Jane Howard in the late 1940s, and she modelled the protagonist in her 1956 novel The Long View on him.

He was patron to the silver and goldsmith Gerald Benney, and owned the Hanover Gallery and the restaurant La Reserve.

Death
Behrens died in the January–March quarter 1989, in London.

References

1911 births
1989 deaths
Bankers from London
People from Kensington
20th-century English businesspeople